Winslow is an impact crater on Mars, located in the Iapygia quadrangle at -3.74°S latitude and 59.16°E longitude. It measures  in diameter and was named after Winslow, Arizona, a town just east of Meteor Crater, which has a similar size and resembles Winslow crater. The two craters also have similar infrared characteristics.

See also 
 HiRISE
 Impact event
 List of craters on Mars
 Ore resources on Mars
 Planetary nomenclature

References 
 

Impact craters on Mars
Iapygia quadrangle